The 2008–09 San Miguel Beermen season was the 34th season of the franchise in the Philippine Basketball Association (PBA).

Key dates
August 30: The 2008 PBA Draft took place in Fort Bonifacio, Taguig.
September 1: The free agency period started.

Draft picks

Roster

Depth chart

Philippine Cup

Eliminations

Standings

Game log

|- bgcolor="#edbebf"
| 1
| October 5
| Alaska
| 84–85
| Custodio (14)
| 
| 
| Cuneta Astrodome
| 0–1
|- bgcolor="#bbffbb"
| 2
| October 10
| Purefoods
| 111–98
| Hontiveros (15)
| 
| 
| Cuneta Astrodome
| 1–1
|- bgcolor="#bbffbb" 
| 3
| October 15
| Rain or Shine
| 89–82
| Hontiveros (17)
| 
| 
| Araneta Coliseum
| 2–1
|- bgcolor="#bbffbb" 
| 4
| October 17
| Talk 'N Text
| 84–77
| Washington (21)
| 
| 
| Araneta Coliseum
| 3–1
|- bgcolor="#bbffbb" 
| 5
| October 22
| Brgy.Ginebra
| 118–89
| Tugade (21)
| 
| 
| Araneta Coliseum
| 4–1
|- bgcolor="#edbebf" 
| 6
| October 25
| Red Bull
| 113–114
| Hontiveros (21)
| 
| 
| Gingoog
| 4–2
|- bgcolor="#bbffbb" 
| 7
| October 30
| Sta.Lucia
| 89–71
| Tugade (19)
| 
| 
| Ynares Sports Arena
| 5–2

|- bgcolor="#bbffbb" 
| 8
| November 5
| Air21
| 130–129 (2OT)
| Hontiveros (25)
| Washington (13)
| 
| Araneta Coliseum
| 6–2
|- bgcolor="#bbffbb" 
| 9
| November 12
| Coca Cola
| 89–86
| Pennisi (18)
| 
| 
| Cuneta Astrodome
| 7–2
|- bgcolor="#edbebf" 
| 10
| November 15
| Alaska
| 85–91
| Custodio (20)
| 
| 
| 
| 7–3
|- bgcolor="#edbebf"
| 11
| November 19
| Sta.Lucia
| 
| 
| 
| 
| Araneta Coliseum
| 7–4
|- bgcolor="#edbebf" 
| 12
| November 23
| Purefoods
| 83–84
| Tugade (18)
| 
| 
| Cuneta Astrodome
| 7–5
|- bgcolor="#bbffbb" 
| 13
| November 26
| Air21
| 98–78
| 
| 
| 
| Araneta Coliseum
| 8–5
|- bgcolor="#edbebf" 
| 14
| November 30
| Talk 'N Text
| 80–85
| Tugade (20)
| 
| 
| Singapore Indoor Stadium
| 8–6

|- bgcolor="#bbffbb"
| 15
| December 6
| Red Bull
| 89–84 
| Washington (24)
| 
| 
| Cuneta Astrodome
| 9–6
|- bgcolor="#edbebf"
| 16
| December 12
| Coca Cola
| 91–105
| 
| 
| 
| Araneta Coliseum
| 9–7
|- bgcolor="#edbebf" 
| 17
| December 17
| Rain or Shine
| 92–93
| Hontiveros (24)
| 
| 
| Araneta Coliseum
| 9–8
|- bgcolor="#edbebf" 
| 18
| December 20
| Brgy.Ginebra
| 82–87
| 
| 
| 
| Batangas City
| 9–9

Fiesta Conference

Eliminations

Standings

Awards and records

Awards

Records

References

San Miguel Beermen seasons
San Miguel